Blândești is a commune in Botoșani County, Western Moldavia, Romania. It is composed of three villages: Blândești, Cerchejeni and Șoldănești.

References

Communes in Botoșani County
Localities in Western Moldavia